The Florida State League Pitcher of the Year Award is an annual award given to the best pitcher in minor league baseball's Florida State League.

Two players each from the Bradenton Marauders, Charlotte Stone Crabs, Clearwater Threshers, Dunedin Blue Jays, Jupiter Hammerheads, Palm Beach Cardinals, St. Lucie Mets, and Tampa Yankees have been selected for the Pitcher of the Year Award, more than any other teams in the league, followed by the Daytona Tortugas, Fort Myers Miracle, and Lakeland Tigers (1).

Two players each from the New York Mets, New York Yankees, Philadelphia Phillies, Pittsburgh Pirates, St. Louis Cardinals, Tampa Bay Rays, and Toronto Blue Jays Major League Baseball (MLB) organizations have won the Pitcher of the Year Award, more than any others, followed by the Cincinnati Reds, Detroit Tigers, Florida Marlins, Miami Marlins, and Minnesota Twins organizations (1).

Key

Winners

References
General

Specific

Florida State League
Minor league baseball trophies and awards
Awards established in 2004